Nikola Mektić and Mate Pavić defeated Lloyd Glasspool and Harri Heliövaara in the final, 3–6, 7–6(7–3), [10–6] to win the doubles tennis title at the 2022 Queen's Club Championships. It was their third ATP Tour doubles title of the season and their 12th title overall together.

Pierre-Hugues Herbert and Nicolas Mahut were the defending champions, but only Mahut returned to defend his title, partnering with Édouard Roger-Vasselin; the pair lost in the first round to Glasspool and Heliövaara.

Seeds

Draw

Draw

Qualifying

Seeds

Qualifiers
  André Göransson /  Ben McLachlan

Qualifying draw

References

External links
 Main draw
 Qualifying draw

Queen's Club Championships - Doubles
Doubles